Vikas Sethi (born 12 May 1976) is an Indian actor. He played the lead role in the 2003 adult drama film Oops!, he went on to play supporting roles in numerous hit TV series and Bollywood films. His most notable television appearances include in Kahiin To Hoga, as Swayam Shergill and in the Indian soap opera Kasautii Zindagi Kay, where he plays the role of Prem Basu. He appeared in the fourth season of Nach Baliye, performing along with his then wife, Amita.

Career
Sethi made his debut in the 2003 adult drama Oops!, where he played the role of a male stripper who falls in love with his best friend's mother. The film was a critical and commercial failure. He has also featured in the blockbuster  film Kabhi Khushi Kabhi Gham. He is most noted for being a part of soap operas such as Kahiin To Hoga, Kyunki Saas Bhi Kabhi Bahu Thi and Kasautii Zindagii Kay.

Filmography

Television

Film

References

External links

1976 births
Living people
Indian male soap opera actors
Male actors from Chandigarh
Male actors in Hindi cinema
Indian male television actors
Indian male film actors
Indian male models